Edward Jackson (born 2 December 1988) is an English former professional rugby union player who played for a number of sides in England and Wales as a Number 8.

Background
Born in Bath, Jackson attended Millfield School and was the captain of the school's 1st XV, coached by former Bath prop Jon Mallet. Upon graduation, the Bath Academy player began his senior professional career at the Rec and the academy manager Frank Butler commented "Edward is an intelligent footballer who understands and reads the game very well. I first saw him play for Somerset U16s three years ago, and he has been training with the Academy ever since. We have liaised closely with Jon Mallett in Edward's development, and are delighted to have signed him full-time.

Club career
As one of the promising stars coming through Bath Academy where Jackson first gained experiences in the A League playing for Bath United, the powerful ball carrier signed a full-time contract with Bath in 2007 and made his senior debut for them against Leicester Tigers in the EDF Energy Cup in October 2008. In 2009, he captained Bath at the Middlesex Sevens.

The backrow moved onto Doncaster Knights in the RFU Championship before making the move to London Welsh in 2012. 
Jackson then signed for Wasps Rugby (Aviva Premiership) in 2014 where he spent two seasons.

Having previously worked with Dragons Director of Rugby Lyn Jones during his time at London Welsh, Jackson signed for Newport Gwent Dragons and made his debut in the Pro12 match against Connacht in September 2015.

International career
Jackson's leadership skills were recognised at international level in his early years, he has previously represented England  and captained both U16 and U18 teams. He was part of the England U18 side that won the Four Nations title in 2006.

Spinal injury
In April 2017, Jackson suffered a spinal injury, a fractured C6/C7 joint dislocation, after diving into the shallow end of a swimming pool. Despite the severity of the injury, Jackson is currently making a positive recovery progress, though he has been told that he will not play rugby professionally again. His previous rugby club Wasps paid tribute to the former Number Eight with standing ovation at the 8th minute during the Aviva Premiership match against Saracens.

Post injury
In April 2018, less than a year after breaking his neck,  Jackson  climbed Snowdon . Jackson’s created a  not-for-profit organisation, M2M, standing for the millimetres he moved his big toe to the mountains he now climbs. He and Olly Barkley, the former England international, run M2M and are committed to raising £250,000 for a spinal injury rehabilitation unit in Nepal.

In 2018 Jackson joined Channel 4 as a reporter for their European Rugby Champions Cup coverage and has also presented their highlights show 'The Big Tackle.' 
He been involved with their coverage of the Autumn Nations Cup, Autumn Nations Series and Irish Autumn Internationals and became a presenter of Channel 4 coverage of the Tokyo 2020 Paralympic Games & Beijing 2022 Winter Paralympic Games also for Channel 4.

During 2020 Jackson climbed Mera Peak in Nepal to raise funds for a spinal unit.  He has become and adventurer, motivational speaker and television presenter .

References

External links 
Newport Gwent Dragons Player Profile
ESPN Player Profile

1988 births
Living people
Rugby union players from Bath, Somerset
Bath Rugby players
English rugby union players
Dragons RFC players
Television presenters with disabilities
Rugby union number eights
People educated at Millfield